Calyptra nyei is a moth of the family Erebidae. It has been found in India.

References

Calpinae
Moths described in 1979